This article is a summary of the closing milestones of the Nasdaq Composite, a United States stock market index. Since first opening at 100.00 on February 5, 1971, the Nasdaq Composite has increased, despite several periods of decline, most recently after the financial crisis.

Milestone highs and lows

Records

Incremental closing milestones
The following is a list of the milestone closing levels of the Nasdaq Composite. Threshold for milestones is as follows: 10-point increments are used up to the 500-point level; 20 to 1,000; 50 to 3,000; 100 to 10,000; and 200-point increments thereafter. Bold formatting is applied to every 4 or 5 milestones, excluding peaks.

The Early 1970s Bull Market (1971-1972)

The 1980s Bull Market (1978-1987)

The 1990s Acceleration Bull Market (1989-2000)

Do-Over of the Milestones (2002-2015)

The 2010s Cyclical Bull Market (2015-2020)

Bull Recession of 2020

List of 1000-point milestones by number of trading days

See also
 Closing milestones of the Dow Jones Industrial Average
 Closing milestones of the S&P 500
 List of largest daily changes in the Nasdaq Composite
 Market trend
 Stock market bubble
 Stock market crash

Notes
1This was the Nasdaq's very first close on February 5, 1971.
2This was the Nasdaq's close at the peak on January 11, 1973.
3This was the Nasdaq's close at the peak on August 27, 1987.
4This was the Nasdaq's close at the peak on March 10, 2000.
5This was the Nasdaq's close at the peak on October 31, 2007.
6The Nasdaq first traded above 5,100 on March 10, 2000; however, it took over 15 years for the Nasdaq to finally close above 5,100.
7This was the Nasdaq's all-time intraday high on March 10, 2000, which was finally broken on June 18, 2015.
8This was the Nasdaq's close at the peak on July 20, 2015, before the 2015-16 stock market selloff.
9The Nasdaq first traded above 5,400 during the session on Tuesday, November 29, 2016, but dropped below before the closing. Over the next few days, Nasdaq returned its post-election gains; however, the Nasdaq finally closed above 5,400 on Thursday, December 8, 2016.
10The Nasdaq first exceeded 5,500 intraday on Tuesday, December 27, 2016, before falling back below before closing and then retreated for the next two days, throwing away some of its recent gains. However, it took until January 6 of next year when the Nasdaq finally closed above 5,500.
11Since first reaching 5,000 on March 7, 2000, the Nasdaq slowly crawled its way towards 6,000 with major setbacks over the course of 17 years before finally trading above 6,000 (intraday and closing) on April 25, 2017.
12The Nasdaq first hit 7,000 during the trading session on Monday, December 18, 2017, before falling back underneath the millenary milestone at closing time and then flirted with it the next day before retreating. January 2, 2018 the first trading day of 2018 was when the Nasdaq first closed above 7,000.
13Although the Nasdaq first reached 7,300 intraday on Tuesday, January 16, 2018, the COMP has flirted with the milestone all week and then closed above it three days later.
14The Nasdaq first reached 7,600 on Monday, March 12, 2018, before falling back below it for the close. This was repeated the next trading day before another major pullback for the year. It took until Monday, June 4, 2018 (nearly three months) for the Nasdaq to finally close above 7,600.
15The Nasdaq first topped 7,800 on Wednesday, June 20, 2018, before falling back underneath at closing time before another pullback took place. It took until July 12, 2018, to finally close above this milestone.
16After peaking on February 19, 2020, the Nasdaq Composite rapidly fell into correction later that same month and into bear market territory in the next month amid the COVID-19 pandemic.

References

 https://finance.yahoo.com/q/hp?s=%5EIXIC+Historical+Prices

Nasdaq